Ronnie Le Drew (born 23 October 1947) is a Canadian-born British puppeteer who was born in Toronto, Canada. He is best known for playing "Zippy" from  the ITV children's show Rainbow since the early 1970s and trained at the Little Angel Theatre, London under John Wright. His association with the Little Angel spans over thirty years as performer, and later as director.

Theatre

His theatre credits have included Ala-al-din (Clifford Heap Miniature Theatre UK Tour) Through Wooden Eyes (Hogarth Puppets UK Tour) Hans the Bell Ringer (Oxford Play House and Civic Theatre Darlington.) Angelo (Purcell Room, London) Soldiers Tale, The Box of Toys, Amahl and the Night Visitors, Genevieve De Brabant, Reynard the Fox. (Queen Elizabeth Hall, London and Norwich Puppet Theatre.) Cinderella, Frog Prince, Peter and the Wolf, Pinocchio, (Midlands Arts Centre, Birmingham.) and Polynesia in Doctor Dolittle UK Tour Scottish Arts Council Funded Tours, and visits to America, Israel, Denmark, France, Belgium and Czechoslovakia followed.

Television

His numerous television credits began in 1964 with A Touch of Don Juan (BBC - narrated by Douglas Fairbanks, Jr.), The Little Mermaid (Associated Re-diffusion), Late Night line up (BBC), Mak the Sheep stealer (ATV) Michael Bentine's Potty Time, The Tommy Cooper Show both for Thames Television. Playdays (BBC), Mortimer and Arabel (BBC), Utterly Brilliant with Timmy Mallett (YTV), Good Morning with Anne and Nick (BBC), Jay's World (Meridian), Roger and the Rotten Trolls. (ITV). Bills New Frock (Channel 4) Ronnie was fortunate to appear with Harry Corbett, Matthew Corbett and also with Richard Cadell on the Sooty Show (Thames Television), and also Sooty Heights (Granada), mainly as Sweep, occasionally as Sooty and once as Scampi. Drew was also an additional puppeteer in The Dark Crystal: Age of Resistance, released on Netflix in 2019. 

However he is probably best known as "Zippy" from ITV's Rainbow and later Rainbow Days. As Zippy, Ronnie has appeared on The Jim Davidson Show (Thames), The Generation Game (BBC), Five (TV)'s Night Fever, The Jonathan Ross Show (Channel 4), The World of Puppets (BBC), The Greatest 100 Kids TV Shows (Channel 4), Ashes to Ashes (BBC), as well as appearances at the Fridge, The Hammersmith Pallais, as well numerous Universities, Night Clubs, and Discos, all over Great Britain with the Rainbow Disco Road Show and Rainbow's Play Your Cards Right.

Film
Film appearances include: 
The Naked Runner which starred Frank Sinatra, 
A Dandy in Aspic, Labyrinth, 
Little Shop of Horrors,
The Muppet Christmas Carol, Muppet Treasure Island, and 
Beauty and the Beast.

Commercials
Commercials include Roundtree's Jelly Tots, Harvest Crunch, American Yellow Page's, London Docklands Crows and even one for a Swedish Toilet Roll. The most enjoyable would be for the Ideal Home Exhibition in the seventies, where he operated the original Bill and Ben The Flower Pot Men! In 2008 he operated the dancing "Brains from Thunderbirds" puppet in the advert for Drench water. In 2010 he operated marionettes for a series of Diet Coke commercials created by UK Ad Agency Mother Advertising.

Bibliography 
 Zippy and Me: My Life Inside Britain’s Most Infamous Puppet, Ronnie Le Drew, Nuala Calvi, Duncan Barrett, Unbound Publishing, 2019, 416 pages,

Teaching
He has taught at Little Angel Theatre, Central School of Speech and Drama, and founded The London School of Puppetry with his partner Caroline Astell-Burt.

References

External links
Ronnie Le Drew

London School of Puppetry

Canadian puppeteers
People from Toronto
Living people
British puppeteers
1947 births